Pat Boone Sings Days of Wine and Roses and Other Movie Themes is a studio album by Pat Boone, released in 1963 on Dot Records.

Track listing

References 

1963 albums
Pat Boone albums
Dot Records albums